"I Hear You Now" is a song by Jon and Vangelis released in November 1979 and is their debut single from their first album Short Stories. It peaked at number eight on the UK Singles Charts, making it the duo's second biggest hit in that country.

Track listing

 "I Hear You Now" – 5:12
 "Thunder" – 2:12

Charts

Weekly charts

Year-end charts

References 

1979 singles
1979 songs
Vangelis songs
Jon Anderson songs
Songs written by Jon Anderson
Songs with music by Vangelis